Hotel Kangerlussuaq is a hotel in Kangerlussuaq, Greenland. Located at Kangerlussuaq Airport, this three-star hotel has 70 rooms and is a notable location for conferences. The hotel is located on the site of a reclaimed United States Air Force base, Sondrestrom Air Base. It is the former base's landing strip which serves as the town's airport and the barracks have been converted to accommodation.

The hotel is also featured in Clive Cussler's book, Sacred Stone.

See also
 List of hotels in Greenland

References

External links 
 Hotel Kangerlussuaq website

Hotels in Greenland
Kangerlussuaq